Kings Lake may refer to:

Kings Lake (Minnesota)
Kings Lake (South Dakota)
Kings Lake (horse) (American thoroughbred, foaled 1978)
 Königssee, a lake in Bavarian Germany

See also
King Lake (disambiguation)